Catherine Tanvier defeated Helena Suková in the final, 6–2, 7–5 to win the girls' singles tennis title at the 1982 Wimbledon Championships.

Seeds

  Helena Suková (final)
  Catherine Tanvier (champion)
  Barbara Gerken (quarterfinals)
  Manuela Maleeva (second round)
  Gretchen Rush (third round)
  Beth Herr (second round)
  Elizabeth Jones (quarterfinals)
  Carling Bassett (quarterfinals)

Draw

Finals

Top half

Section 1

Section 2

Bottom half

Section 3

Section 4

References

External links

Girls' Singles
Wimbledon Championship by year – Girls' singles